Bracken County High School is located in Brooksville, Kentucky, United States, and is part of the Bracken County school district. The school was founded as Brooksville High School. In 1947, the school changed its name to Bracken County High School.

Athletics and clubs

Bracken County High School competes in the Kentucky High School Athletic Association.

Boys sports
Boys sports teams include basketball, baseball, cross country running, football, tennis, and track and field.

Girls sports
Girls sports teams include basketball, cross country running, fast-pitch softball, tennis, track and field, volleyball, and cheerleading.

Clubs
Clubs include academic team, art club, National Beta Club, choir, Future Business Leaders of America, Fellowship of Christian Athletes, Family, Career and Community Leaders of America, Future Educators Association, National FFA Organization, French club, Spanish club, yearbook club, archery, and 4-H

Notable alumni
Don Galloway, American stage, film and television actor

References

Schools in Bracken County, Kentucky
Public high schools in Kentucky